Anthony Cooper may refer to:

 Anthony Cooper (baseball) (1904–1979), American Negro league baseball player
 Anthony Cooper (Lost)
 Anthony Cooper (racing driver); see 1964 Armstrong 500

See also

Tony Cooper (disambiguation)
Anthony Ashley-Cooper (disambiguation)
Cooper (surname)